De Hoop is a tower mill in Arnhem, Gelderland, Netherlands which was built in 1846 and is in working order. The mill is listed as a Rijksmonument.

History
De Hoop was built in 1846. In 1900, a steam engine was installed. This was replaced by a petrol engine in 1910. The mill ceased working by wind in 1931, after which its condition deteriorated. The mill was restored in 1951 by Beyk of Afferden, Gelderland, but not to working order. The mill was bought by the Gemeente Arnhem in 1975. In 1977, the mill was restored to working order, and officially opened on National Mills Day, 1978. In January 1999, the mill was registered as a place where weddings may take place. The Molen van Sloten, Sloten, North Holland is the only other windmill in the Netherlands to be so registered. De Hoop is listed as a Rijksmonument, № 8387.

Description

De Hoop is what the Dutch describe as a "Beltmolen". It is a tower mill built into a mound. The cap is thatched. The mill is winded by tailpole and winch. The sails are Common sails. The sails are carried on a cast-iron windshaft, which was cast by Metaalpletterij L.I. Enthoven & Compagnie, The Hague, South Holland. The windshaft also carries the brake wheel which has 62 teeth. This drives a wallower which has 29 teeth located at the top of the upright shaft At the bottom of the upright shaft is the great spur wheel, which has 73 teeth. This drives two pairs of  French Burr millstones via lantern pinion stone nuts which have 14 staves each.

Public access
De Hoop is open on Thursdays from 12:00 to 14:00 and Saturdays from 10:00 to 15:00, or by appointment.

See also
Windmills in Arnhem
De Kroon

Windmills in the Netherlands Open Air Museum
Boktjasjker
Het Fortuyn
Huizermolen
Mijn Genoegen
Spinnenkop
Arnhem post mill (1946)
Arnhem post mill (1989)
Arnhem smock mill (1960)

Notes
 Not to be confused with the mill built in 1849 and also known as De Hoop.

References

External links

mill website 

Windmills in Gelderland
Windmills completed in 1846
Tower mills in the Netherlands
Grinding mills in the Netherlands
Agricultural buildings in the Netherlands
Rijksmonuments in Arnhem